The Sword in the Stone may refer to:

 A weapon in the Arthurian legend of Excalibur, which only the rightful king of Britain can pull from the stone
 The medieval sword of Galgano Guidotti, embedded in a rock at Montesiepi Chapel, Siena, Italy

Literature and film 
 The Sword in the Stone (novel), a 1938 novel by T. H. White
 The Sword in the Stone (1963 film), a Disney animated film based on the T. H. White novel
 The Sword in the Stone (upcoming film), a live-action remake of the 1963 film
 "The Sword in the Stone", a 2011 two-part episode in the fourth season of the British television series Merlin
 The Sword in the Stone, a play by Chinese-Canadian playwright Marty Chan

Music 
 "Sword and Stone", a song released by the German band Bonfire on their 1989 album Point Blank
 The Sword in the Stone, a music composition for a 1939 six-part radio show composed by Benjamin Britten
 A song by Kayak on their 1981 studio album Merlin
 A song by Ted Leo and the Pharmacists on the 2003 EP Tell Balgeary, Balgury Is Dead
 A song by Banks & Steelz on the 2016 Anything But Words

Other uses 
 "Indiana Jones and the Sword in the Stone", one of three adventures in the game Indiana Jones and the Tomb of the Templars

See also 
 Excalibur (disambiguation)
 Galgano Guidotti
 "Sword from the Stone", a 2021 song by English singer-songwriter Passenger